The HN-5 is a family of first generation Chinese man-portable air-defense systems (MANPAD) based on Soviet technology.  The HN abbreviation is used to avoid confusion with HY (Hai Ying, or Sea Eagle) series anti-ship missiles of Silkworm missile family.  The HN-5 series in Chinese hands has been phased out in front-line and first line reserve units by QW series MANPAD, but still being used by militia units.

Development 
The HN-5 is a reverse-engineered version of the Soviet Strela 2 (SA-7). Due to the urgent need for MANPADs, North Vietnam provided China with an original sample during the Vietnam War and asked China to produce and supply NVA with copies.  However, due to the political turmoil in China, namely, the Cultural Revolution, the reverse-engineering process was slow and by the time the first small production batch was sent to Vietnam for evaluation, the results were ineffective because American aircraft has already adopted ECM to successfully counter HN-5 and its Soviet counterpart the Strela 2.  The dimensions and performance of HN-5 is extremely similar to that of Strela 2.

Variants

HN-5A
As the result of unsatisfactory performance of the original HN-5, China immediately begun to improve the missile and North Vietnam once again provided China with the original Soviet sample during the Vietnam War, this time the Strela 2M.  However, when the Chinese finally completed its improvement, it was already too late to see action, because the Vietnam War was over and the relationship between the two countries had soured.
Length: 1.46 m
Weight: 10.2 kg
System weight: 16.5 kg
Missile diameter: 72 mm
Warhead: 0.5 kg
Fuse: impact
Speed: 500 m/s
Range: 800 m – 4.4 km
Altitude: 50 m – 2.5 km

HN-5B
Developed by China based on the Soviet 9K34 Strela-3. Although the missile had entered service with the Chinese army in the mid 1980s, it was not until 1990 when it was first publicly revealed in China.  According to many domestic Chinese media sources and some sources outside China, Chinese obtained the Soviet samples via Zaire from UNITA captured 9K34 Strela-3 from Angola governmental forces, the exact the same way China obtained the 9K310 Igla-1 a short time later.  The missile entered in service with the Pakistani army in January 1990.

Foreign Variant
Pakistan has produced a missile as the Anza Mk I, based on tech from the HN-5B.

HN-5C
A vehicle-mounted version of HN-5B that first entered production in 1986, but was not revealed to the public in China until the early 1990s.  A total of eight missiles are configured into two groups of four missiles mounted on a 4x4 vehicle with an electro-optical fire control system.  The size of the vehicle determined whether reloads could be used.  Although the missiles of the vehicle-mounted version can be used as MANPADs, they can not be used as such in the field, they need to be retrofitted first.

HQ-5C
HQ stands for Hong Qi, or Red Flag, the common Chinese designation for their surface-to-air missiles.  The missile was specifically developed in the 1980s for export, and it is an Westernized HN-5B by adopting western standards.  The reason was because despite its low price, when the Soviet style HN-5 had been exported to third world countries mainly armed with western weaponry, the compatibility issues and associated logistical problems increased the overall life cycle cost of the missile.  To avert this, the missile is modified to be compatible with western standards.

Operators

: 100 acquired in 1978.
: 50 HN-5As acquired in 1991–1992, 21 HN-5JA1 acquired in 2001.
: 30 HN-5As acquired in 1994.
: 1,000 acquired in 1992.

: 72 HN-5As acquired in 1995.

: 500 acquired from 1986-1988.
: 200 HN-5As acquired in 1992.
: 600 acquired unknown number from 1983 to 1994.
: 1,000 acquired from 1987-1988.
: 1,150 acquired from 1987-1988.

Non-state actors
 United Wa State Army
 Afghan Mujahideen

See also
 Anza
 Misagh-2
 Qaem

References

Surface-to-air missiles of the People's Republic of China
Cold War weapons of China
Guided missiles of the People's Republic of China
Weapons of the People's Republic of China
China–Soviet Union relations
Surface-to-air missiles of Iran